Night and Day II is the 15th studio album by Joe Jackson, released in 2000. It was a revisit of the style of his 1982 album, Night and Day, featuring songs about the New York City lifestyle, seen through different characters.

While the original Night and Day took a satirical look at the downfalls of city life through songs such as "TV Age", "Cancer" and "Real Men", Night and Day II focuses primarily on the dark side of inner city living (the song, "Happyland", for instance, is about the 1990 arson fire at Happy Land Social Club in the Bronx that killed 87 people)  as seen though the eyes of a cynical New Yorker, as Jackson lived in New York at the time.

The cover artwork is a dark nighttime shot taken from within a New York City cab, with the World Trade Center in the foreground, taken a year prior to   9/11.

The music is built with contributions from Graham Maby (bass), and Sue Hadjopoulos (percussion). Also featured are the string quartet Ethel, and three guest vocalists: Iranian diva Sussan Deyhim, drag performer Dale De Vere and Marianne Faithfull, who sings vocals on "Love Got Lost".

Track listing
All songs written, arranged and produced by Joe Jackson.

Personnel 
 Musicians
 Joe Jackson – piano, keyboards, synth basses
 Mary Rowell, Todd Reynolds – violin
 Ralph Farris – viola
 Dorothy Lawson – cello
 Graham Maby – bass guitar on "Glamour and Pain", "Love Got Lost" and "Just Because..."
 Sue Hadjopoulos – percussion on "Prelude", "Hell of a Town", "Stranger Than You" and "Happyland"
 Gary Burke – drum kit on "Love Got Lost"
 Sussan Deyhim, Dale De Vere, Marianne Faithfull, Alexandra Montano – vocals

 Production 
 Joe Jackson – arrangements, producer, sequencing
 Dan Gellert – associate producer, recording engineer
 Charlie Post, Ross Petersen – assistant recording engineer
 Ted Jensen – mastering engineer
 Nitin Vadukul, Alex Vandoros – photography

Charts

References

External links 
 Night and Day II album information at The Joe Jackson Archive

2000 albums
Joe Jackson (musician) albums
Sequel albums